The Territorial Prelature of Tefé is a Roman Catholic territorial prelature located in the city of Tefé in the Ecclesiastical province of Manaus in Brazil.

History
 On 23 May 1910, the Apostolic Prefecture of Tefé was founded from the Diocese of Amazonas
 On 11 August 1950, the Prefecture was promoted to the Territorial Prelature of Tefé

Bishops
Prefects Apostolic of Tefé (Roman rite)
 Fr. Miguel Alfredo Barat, C.S.Sp. (16 August 1910 - 1946)
 Bishop Joaquim de Lange, C.S.Sp. (19 July 1946 - 18 April 1952) appointed Prelate of Tefé
 Prelates of Tefé (Roman rite)
 Bishop Joaquim de Lange, C.S.Sp. (18 April 1952 - 15 December 1982)
 Bishop Mário Clemente Neto, C.S.Sp. (15 December 1982 - 19 October 2000)
 Bishop Sérgio Eduardo Castriani, C.S.Sp. (19 October 2000 - 12 December 2012)
 Bishop Fernando Barbosa dos Santos, C.M. (14 May 2014 - 9 June 2021)
 Bishop José Altevir da Silva, C.S.Sp. (9 March 2022 - present)

Coadjutor prelate
Sérgio Eduardo Castriani, C.S.Sp. (1998-2000)

References
 GCatholic.org
 Catholic Hierarchy

Roman Catholic dioceses in Brazil
Christian organizations established in 1910
Tefé, Territorial Prelature of
Roman Catholic dioceses and prelatures established in the 20th century
Territorial prelatures
Tefé